Kurdistan (lit. "land of the Kurds"), or Greater Kurdistan, is a roughly defined geo-cultural territory in Western Asia wherein the Kurds form a prominent majority population and the Kurdish culture, languages, and national identity have historically been based. Geographically, Kurdistan roughly encompasses the northwestern Zagros and the eastern Taurus mountain ranges.

Kurdistan generally comprises the following four regions: southeastern Turkey (Northern Kurdistan), northern Iraq (Southern Kurdistan), northwestern Iran (Eastern Kurdistan), and northern Syria (Western Kurdistan). Some definitions also include parts of southern Transcaucasia. Certain Kurdish nationalist organizations seek to create an independent nation state consisting of some or all of these areas with a Kurdish majority, while others campaign for greater autonomy within the existing national boundaries.

Historically, the word "Kurdistan" is first attested in 11th century Seljuk chronicles. Many disparate Kurdish dynasties, emirates, principalities, and chiefdoms were established from the 8th to 19th centuries. Administratively, the 20th century saw the establishment of the short-lived areas of the Kurdish state (1918–1919), Kingdom of Kurdistan (1921–1924), Kurdistansky Uyezd i.e. "Red Kurdistan" (1923–1929), Republic of Ararat (1927–1930), and Republic of Mahabad (1946).

Iraqi Kurdistan first gained autonomous status in a 1970 agreement with the Iraqi government, and its status was re-confirmed as the autonomous Kurdistan Region within the federal Iraqi republic in 2005. There is also a Kurdistan Province in Iran, but it is not self-ruled. Kurds fighting in the Syrian Civil War were able to take control of large sections of northern Syria and establish self-governing regions in an Autonomous Administration of North and East Syria, where they call for autonomy in a federal Syria after the war.

Etymology and delineation 
Kurdistan means "Land of the Kurds" and was first attested in 11th-century Seljuk chronicles.The exact origins of the name Kurd are unclear. The suffix -stan (Persian: ـستان, translit. stân) is Persian for land.

"Kurdistan" was also formerly spelled Curdistan. One of the ancient names of Kurdistan is Corduene. The 19th-century Kurdistan Eyalet was the first time that the Ottoman Empire used the term 'Kurdistan' to refer to an administrative unit rather than a geographical region.

Albeit admitting a thorough delineation is difficult, the Encyclopaedia of Islam delineated Kurdistan as following:

History

Ancient history 

Various groups, among them the Guti, Hurrians, Mannai (Mannaeans), and Armenians, lived in this region in antiquity. The original Mannaean homeland was situated east and south of the Lake Urmia, roughly centered around modern-day Mahabad. The region came under Persian rule during the reign of Cyrus the Great and Darius I.

The Kingdom of Corduene, which emerged from the declining Seleucid Empire, was located to the south and south-east of Lake Van between Persia and Mesopotamia and ruled northern Mesopotamia and southeastern Anatolia from 189 BC to AD 384 as vassals of the vying Parthian and Roman empires. Corduene became a vassal state of the Roman Republic in 66 BC and remained allied with the Romans until AD 384. After 66 BC, it passed another 5 times between Rome and Persia. Corduene was situated to the east of Tigranocerta, that is, to the east and south of present-day Diyarbakır in south-eastern Turkey.

Some historians have correlated a connection between Corduene with the modern names of Kurds and Kurdistan; T. A. Sinclair dismissed this identification as false, while a common association is asserted in the Columbia Encyclopedia.

Some of the ancient districts of Kurdistan and their corresponding modern names:
 Corduene or Gordyene (Siirt, Bitlis and Şırnak)
 Sophene (Diyarbakır)
 Zabdicene or Bezabde (Gozarto d'Qardu or Jazirat Ibn or Cizre)
 Basenia (Bayazid)
 Moxoene (Muş)
 Nephercerta (Miyafarkin)
 Artemita (Van)

One of the earliest records of the phrase land of the Kurds is found in an Assyrian Christian document of late antiquity, describing the stories of Assyrian saints of the Middle East, such as Abdisho. When the Sasanian Marzban asked Mar Abdisho about his place of origin, he replied that according to his parents, they were originally from Hazza, a village in Assyria. However, they were later driven out of Hazza by pagans, and settled in Tamanon, which according to Abdisho was in the land of the Kurds. Tamanon lies just north of the modern Iraq-Turkey border, while Hazza is 12 km southwest of modern Erbil. In another passage in the same document, the region of the Khabur River is also identified as land of the Kurds. According to Al-Muqaddasi and Yaqut al-Hamawi, Tamanon was located on the south-western or southern slopes of Mount Judi and south of Cizre. Other geographical references to the Kurds in Syriac sources appear in Zuqnin chronicle, writings of Michael the Syrian and Bar Hebraeus. They mention the mountains of Qardu, city of Qardu and country of Qardawaye.

Post-classical history 

In the tenth and eleventh centuries, several Kurdish principalities emerged in the region: in the north the Shaddadids (951–1174) (in east Transcaucasia between the Kur and Araxes rivers) and the Rawadids (955–1221) (centered on Tabriz and which controlled all of Azerbaijan), in the east the Hasanwayhids (959–1015) (in Zagros between Shahrizor and Khuzistan) and the Annazids (990–1116) (centered in Hulwan) and in the west the Marwanids (990–1096) to the south of Diyarbakır and north of Jazira.

Kurdistan in the Middle Ages was a collection of semi-independent and independent states called emirates. It was nominally under indirect political or religious influence of Khalifs or Shahs. A comprehensive history of these states and their relationship with their neighbors is given in the text of Sharafnama, written by Prince Sharaf al-Din Bitlisi in 1597. The emirates included Baban, Soran, Badinan and Garmiyan in the south; Bakran, Bohtan (or Botan) and Badlis in the north, and Mukriyan and Ardalan in the east.

The earliest medieval attestation of the toponym Kurdistan is found in a 12th-century Armenian historical text by Matteos Urhayeci. He described a battle near Amid and Siverek in 1062 as to have taken place in Kurdistan. The second record occurs in the prayer from the colophon of an Armenian manuscript of the Gospels, written in 1200.

A later use of the term Kurdistan is found in Empire of Trebizond documents in 1336 and in Nuzhat al-Qulub, written by Hamdallah Mustawfi in 1340.

According to Sharaf al-Din Bitlisi in his Sharafnama, the boundaries of the Kurdish land begin at the Strait of Hormuz in the Persian Gulf and stretch on an even line to the end of Malatya and Marash. Evliya Çelebi, who traveled in the region between 1640 and 1655, mentioned that Kurdistan includes  Erzurum, Van, Hakkari, Cizre, Imaddiya, Mosul, Shahrizor, Harir, Ardalan, Baghdad, Derne, Derteng, until Basra.

In the 16th century, after prolonged wars, Kurdish-inhabited areas were split between the Safavid and Ottoman empires. A major division of Kurdistan occurred in the aftermath of the Battle of Chaldiran in 1514, and was formalized in the 1639 Treaty of Zuhab. In a geography  textbook of late Ottoman military school by Ahmet Cevad Kurdistan span over the cities Erzurum, Van, Urfa, Sulaymanyah, Kirkuk, Mosul and Diyarbakir among others and was one out of six regions of Ottoman Asia.

Modern history 
After the collapse of the Ottoman Empire, the Allies contrived to split Kurdistan (as detailed in the ultimately unratified Treaty of Sèvres) among several countries, including Kurdistan, Armenia and others. However, the reconquest of these areas by the forces of Kemal Atatürk (and other pressing issues) caused the Allies to accept the renegotiated Treaty of Lausanne (1923) and the borders of the modern Republic of Turkey, leaving the Kurds without a self-ruled region. Other Kurdish areas were assigned to the new British and French mandated states of Iraq and Syria.

At the San Francisco Peace Conference of 1945, the Kurdish delegation proposed consideration of territory claimed by the Kurds, which encompassed an area extending from the Mediterranean shores near Adana to the shores of the Persian Gulf near Bushehr, and included the Lur inhabited areas of southern Zagros.

The historian Jordi Tejel has identified "Greater Kurdistan" as being one of the "Kurdish myths" that the Kurdistan Democratic Party of Syria (KDPS) were involved in promoting to Kurds in Syria.

An academic source published by the University of Cambridge has described maps of greater Kurdistan created in the 1940s and forward as: "These maps have become some of the most influential propaganda tools for the Kurdish nationalist discourse. They depict a territorially exaggerated version of the territory of Kurdistan, extending into areas with no majority Kurdish populations. Despite their production with political aims related to specific claims on the demographic and ethnographic structure of the region, and their questionable methodologies, they have become 'Kurdistan in the minds of Kurds' and the boundaries they indicate have been readily accepted."

At the end of the 1991 Gulf War, the Coalition established a no-fly zone over northern Iraq to provide humanitarian relief to and safeguard the Kurds who would be subjected to Iraqi air attacks. Amid the withdrawal of Iraqi forces from three northern provinces, Kurdistan Region emerged in 1992 as an autonomous entity inside Iraq with its own local government and parliament.

A 2010 US report, written before the instability in Syria and Iraq that exists as of 2014, attested that "Kurdistan may exist by 2030". The weakening of the Iraqi state following the 2014 Northern Iraq offensive by the Islamic State of Iraq and the Levant has also presented an opportunity for independence for Iraqi Kurdistan, augmented by Turkey's move towards acceptance of such a state although it opposes moves toward Kurdish autonomy in Turkey and Syria.

Northern Kurdistan 

The incorporation into Turkey of the Kurdish-inhabited regions of eastern Anatolia was opposed by many Kurds, and has resulted in a long-running separatist conflict in which tens of thousands of lives have been lost. The region saw several major Kurdish rebellions, including the Koçgiri rebellion of 1920 under the Ottomans, then successive insurrections under the Turkish state, including the 1924 Sheikh Said rebellion, the Republic of Ararat in 1927, and the 1937 Dersim rebellion. All were forcefully put down by the authorities. The region was declared a closed military area from which foreigners were banned between 1925 and 1965.

In an attempt to deny their existence, the Turkish government categorized Kurds as "Mountain Turks" until 1991. The words "Kurds", "Kurdistan", or "Kurdish" were officially banned by the Turkish government. Following the military coup of 1980, the Kurdish language was officially prohibited in public and private life. Many people who spoke, published, or sang in Kurdish were arrested and imprisoned. Throughout the 1990s and early 2000s, political parties that represented Kurdish interests were banned.

In 1983, the Kurdish provinces were included in the a state of emergency region, which was placed under martial law in response to the activities of the militant separatist organization the Kurdistan Workers' Party (PKK). A guerrilla war took place through the 1980s and 1990s in which much of the countryside was evacuated, thousands of Kurdish villages were destroyed by the government, and numerous summary executions were carried out by both sides. Food embargoes were placed on Kurdish villages and towns. Tens of thousands were killed in the violence and hundreds of thousands were forced to leave their homes.

Turkey has historically feared that a Kurdish state in Northern Iraq would encourage and support Kurdish separatists in the adjacent Turkish provinces, and have therefore historically strongly opposed Kurdish independence in Iraq. However, following the chaos in Iraq after the US invasion, Turkey has increasingly worked with the autonomous Kurdistan Regional Government. The word 'Kurdistan', whether written or spoken, can still lead to detention and prosecution in Turkey. Kurdistan has been characterized as an "international colony" by the scholar Ismail Besikci.

Iraqi Kurdistan 
The successful 2014 Northern Iraq offensive by the Islamic State of Iraq and the Levant, with the resultant weakening of the ability of the Iraqi state to project power, also presented a "golden opportunity" for the Kurds to increase their independence and possibly declare an independent Kurdish state. The Islamic State in Iraq and the Levant, who took more than 80 Turkish persons captive in Mosul during their offensive, is an enemy of Turkey, making Kurdistan useful for Turkey as a buffer state. On 28 June 2014 Hüseyin Çelik, a spokesman for the ruling Justice and Development Party (AKP), made comments to the Financial Times indicating Turkey's readiness to accept an independent Kurdistan in northern Iraq.

Syrian Civil War 

Various sources have reported that Al-Nusra has issued a fatwā calling for Kurdish women and children in Syria to be killed, and the fighting in Syria has led tens of thousands of refugees to flee to Iraq's Kurdistan region. As of 2015, Turkey was actively supporting Al-Nusra, but as of January 2017, Turkey's foreign ministry has said that Al-Nusra is a terrorist group and has acted accordingly.

People 

The Kurds are a people of Indo-Iranian origin. They speak an Iranian language known as Kurdish, and comprise the majority of the population of the region – however, included therein are Arab, Armenian, Assyrian, Azerbaijani, Jewish, Ossetian, Persian, and Turkish communities. Most inhabitants are Muslim, but adherents to other religions are present as well – including Yarsanism, Yazidism, Alevis, Christians, and in the past, Jews, most of whom emigrated to Israel.

Geography 

According to the Encyclopædia Britannica, Kurdistan covers about 190,000 km² (or 73,000 square miles), and its chief towns are Diyarbakır (Amed), Bitlis (Bedlîs) and Van (Wan) in Turkey, Erbil (Hewlêr) and Sulaymaniyah in Iraq, and Kermanshah (Kirmanşan), Sanandaj (Sine), Ilam and Mahabad (Mehabad) in Iran. According to the Encyclopaedia of Islam, Kurdistan covers around 190,000 km² (73,000 sq. mi.) in Turkey, 125,000 km² (48,000 sq. mi.) in Iran, 65,000 km² (25,000 sq. mi.) in Iraq, and 12,000 km² (5,000 sq. mi.) in Syria, with a total area of approximately 392,000 km² (151,000 sq. mi.).

Iraqi Kurdistan is divided into six governorates, three of which (and parts of others) are under the control of the Kurdistan Regional Government. Iranian Kurdistan encompasses Kurdistan Province and the greater parts of West Azerbaijan, Kermanshah, and Īlām provinces. Syrian Kurdistan is located primarily in northern Syria, and covers the province of Al Hasakah and northern Raqqa Governorate, northern Aleppo Governorate and also Jabal al-Akrad (Mountain of the Kurds) region. The major cities in this region are Qamishli (Kurdish: Qamişlo) and Al Hasakah (Kurdish: Hasakah).

Turkish Kurdistan encompasses a large area of Eastern Anatolia Region and southeastern Anatolia of Turkey and it is home to an estimated 6 to 8 million Kurds. There are another 9 to 12 million Turkish citizens of Kurdish descent in predominantly Turkish regions of Turkey as the majority of Turkish Kurds no longer live in Southeastern Anatolia.

Subdivisions (Upper and Lower Kurdistan) 
In A Dictionary of Scripture Geography (published 1846), John Miles describes Upper and Lower Kurdistan as following:

The northern, northwestern and northeastern parts of Kurdistan are referred to as upper Kurdistan, and includes the areas from west of Amed to Lake Urmia.

The lowlands of southern Kurdistan are called lower Kurdistan. The main cities in this area are Kirkuk and Arbil.

Climate 
Much of the region is typified by a continental climate – hot in the summer, cold in the winter. Despite this, much of the region is fertile and has historically exported grain and livestock. Precipitation varies between 200 and 400 mm a year in the plains, and between 700 and 3,000 mm a year on the high plateau between mountain chains. The mountainous zone along the borders with Iran and Turkey experiences dry summers, rainy and sometimes snowy winters, and damp springs, while to the south the climate progressively transitions toward semi-arid and desert zones.

Flora and fauna
Kurdistan is one of the most mountainous regions in the world with a cold climate receiving annual precipitation adequate to sustain temperate forests and shrubs. Mountain chains harbor pastures and forested valleys, totaling approximately 16 million hectares (160,000 km²), including firs and countryside is mostly oaks, conifers, platanus, willow, poplar and, to the west of Kurdistan, olive trees.

The region north of the mountainous region on the border with Iran and Turkey features meadow grasses and such wild trees as, Abies cilicica, Fagus sylvatica, Quercus calliprinos, Quercus brantii, Quercus infectoria, Quercus ithaburensis, Quercus macranthera, Cupressus sempervirens, Platanus orientalis, Pinus brutia, Juniperus foetidissima, Juniperus excelsa, Juniperus oxycedrus, Prunus cerasus, Salix alba, Fraxinus excelsior, Paliurus spina-christi, Olea europaea, Ficus carica, Populus euphratica, Populus nigra, Crataegus monogyna, Crataegus azarolus, Prunus cerasifera, rose hips, Cercis siliquastrum, pistachio trees, pear and Sorbus graeca. The desert in the south is mostly steppe and would feature xeric plants such as palm trees, tamarix, date palm, fraxinus, poa, white wormwood and chenopodiaceae. The steppe and desert in the south, by contrast, have such species as palm trees and date palm.

Animals found in the region include the Syrian brown bear, wild boar, gray wolf, the golden jackal, Indian crested porcupine, the red fox, goitered gazelle, Eurasian otter, striped hyena, Persian fallow deer, long-eared hedgehog, onager, mangar and the Euphrates softshell turtle. Birds include, the hooded crow, common starling, Eurasian magpie, European robin, water pipit, spotted flycatcher, namaqua dove, saker falcon, griffon vulture, little crake and collared pratincole, among others.

Mountains 
Mountains are important geographical and symbolic features of Kurdish life, as evidenced by the saying "Kurds have no friends but the mountains." Mountains are regarded as sacred by the Kurds. Included in the region are Mount Judi and Ararat (both prominent in Kurdish folklore), Zagros, Qandil, Shingal, Mount Abdulaziz, Kurd Mountains, Jabal al-Akrad, Shaho, Gabar, Hamrin, and Nisir.

Water resources 
Iraqi Kurdistan is a region relatively rich in water, especially for countries in the Middle East region. It is the source for much of the water supply for neighboring countries. It means that political stability and peace in the region are important to the water supply of the region and preventing wars. Many think that for conserving the water "returning to traditional water-conserving cultivation techniques" will be needed, as well as "communal economy"

Rivers

The plateaus and mountains of Kurdistan, which are characterized by heavy rain and snow fall, act as a water reservoir for the Near and Middle East, forming the source of the Tigris and Euphrates rivers, as well as other numerous smaller rivers, such as the Little Khabur, Khabur, Tharthar, Ceyhan, Araxes, Kura, Sefidrud, Karkha, and Hezil. Among rivers of historical importance to Kurds are the Murat (Arasān) and Buhtān rivers in Turkey; the Peshkhābur, the Little Zab, the Great Zab, and the Diyala in Iraq; and the Jaghatu (Zarrinarud), the Tātā'u (Siminarud), the Zohāb (Zahāb), and the Gāmāsiyāb in Iran.

These rivers, which flow from heights of three to four thousand meters above sea level, are significant both as water sources and for the production of energy. Iraq and Syria dammed many of these rivers and their tributaries. Turkey has an extensive dam system under construction as part of the GAP (Southeast Anatolia Project); though incomplete, the GAP already supplies a significant proportion of Turkey's electrical energy needs. Due to the extraordinary archaeological richness of the region, almost any dam impacts historic sites. With the outbreak of the Syrian civil war, Turkey is was accused of withholding water from the reservoir Lake Assad in Syria, while filling the Atatürk dam in Turkey. 

Lakes

Kurdistan extends to Lake Urmia in Iran on the east. The region includes Lake Van, the largest body of water in Turkey; the only lake in the Middle East with a larger surface is Lake Urmia – though not nearly as deep as Lake Van, which has a much larger volume. Urmia, Van, as well as Zarivar Lake west of Marivan, and Lake Dukan near the city of Sulaymaniyah, are frequented by tourists.

Petroleum and mineral resources 
Extraction of these reserves began in 2007.

Al-Hasakah province, also known as Jazira region, has geopolitical importance of oil and is suitable for agricultural lands.

In November 2011, Exxon challenged the Iraqi central government's authority with the signing of oil and gas contracts for exploration rights to six parcels of land in Kurdistan, including one contract in the disputed territories, just east of the Kirkuk mega-field. This act caused Baghdad to threaten to revoke Exxon's contract in its southern fields, most notably the West-Qurna Phase 1 project. Exxon responded by announcing its intention to leave the West-Qurna project.

Notable companies active in Kurdistan include ExxonMobil, Total, Chevron, Talisman Energy, Genel Energy, Hunt Oil, Gulf Keystone Petroleum, and Marathon Oil.

Other mineral resources that exist in significant quantities in the region include coal, copper, gold, iron, limestone (which is used to produce cement), marble, and zinc. The world's largest deposit of rock sulfur is located just southwest of Erbil.

In July 2012, Turkey and the Kurdistan Region signed an agreement by which Turkey would regularly supply the KRG with refined petroleum products in exchange for crude oil.

Media

Television 
Azhdar Show

Gallery

See also 
 Ark of Nuh or Noah
 Armenian highlands
 Assyrian homeland
 Irredentism
 Lists of active separatist movements
 Mountains of Ararat
 Thamanin
 Zagros Mountains
 Mount Judi

References

Sources

Further reading 
 Beşikçi, İsmail. Selected Writings [about] Kurdistan and Turkish Colonialism. London: Published jointly by Kurdistan Solidarity Committee and Kurdistan Information Centre, 1991. 44 p. Without ISBN
 
 King, Diane E. Kurdistan on the Global Stage: Kinship, Land, and Community in Iraq (Rutgers University Press; 2014) 267 pages; Scholarly study of traditional social networks, such as patron-client relations, as well as technologically mediated communication, in a study of gender, kinship, and social life in Iraqi Kurdistan.
 Öcalan, Abdullah, Interviews and Speeches [about the Kurdish cause]. London: Published jointly by Kurdistan Solidarity Committee and Kurdistan Information Centre, 1991. 46 p. Without ISBN
 Reed, Fred A. Anatolia Junction: a Journey into Hidden Turkey. Burnaby, B.C.: Talonbooks [sic], 1999. 320 p., ill. with b&w photos. N.B.: Includes a significant coverage of the Turkish sector of historic Kurdistan, the Kurds, and their resistance movement.

External links 

 

 
Divided regions
Cultural regions
Historical regions
Kurdistan independence movement
Kurdish irredentism